Tebing Tinggi Deli or more commonly simply Tebing Tinggi is a city near the eastern coast of Northern Sumatra, Indonesia. It has an area of 38.44 km2 and a population at the 2010 Census of 145,180, which grew to 172,838 at the 2020 Census. Tebing Tinggi is an enclave within Serdang Bedagai Regency, as it is surrounded by Serdang Bedagai Regency, which has a kecamatan (district) bordering the city which is named Tebingtinggi as well.

Geography
According to the Agency for Information and Communication Data North Sumatra, Tebing Tinggi is one of the municipality of 33 districts / municipalities in North Sumatra, located around 80 km from Medan (capital of North Sumatra Province) and it is located at a crossroads of Trans-Sumatran Highway, connecting the East Coast Highway; Tanjungbalai, Rantau Prapat and Central Sumatra Highway; Pematangsiantar, Parapat, and Balige.

Administrative districts
The city is divided administratively into five districts (kecamatan), tabulated below with their areas and their populations at the 2010 Census and the 2020 Census.

Demographics
The residents of Tebing Tinggi are Malays (70%), Batak (11%) and Chinese (8%). Javanese, Mandailing, Indian and other ethnicities are recognized ethnic minorities. The city's religion is predominantly Islam, followed by Christianity, Buddhism and other religions.

Climate
Tebing Tinggi has a tropical rainforest climate (Af) with heavy rainfall year-round.

References

External links